Private market assets refer to investments in equity (shares) and debt issued by privately owned (non listed) companies – as opposed to ‘public’ (listed) corporations. These markets include private equity (PE) and venture capital (VC); real estate (property); infrastructure; farmland and forestry.

Private Market Assets Matrix (PMAM)

The Private Market Assets Matrix (PMAM), also called Infrastructure and Private Markets Investment Matrix, is an original strategic assessment tool developed by M. Nicolas Firzli, World Pensions Council and Joshua Franzel, MissionSquare Research Institute, International City/County Management Association. The matrix maps out the evolution of "institutional investment by visualizing dynamically the proportion of assets allocated to infrastructure (Y axis) and private-market assets overall (X axis) for a cross-section of pension funds perceived as highly representative” [of future trends].

References

Economic policy
Finance
Public policy
Infrastructure investment
Actuarial science
Pension funds
Private equity